
The Duchy of Aosta, originally the County of Aosta, was a realm ruled by the House of Savoy from the early 11th century until the late 18th, when its independent institutions were aligned with those of the Principality of Piedmont. The title "Duke of Aosta" continued to be used by the second sons of the Savoyard monarch. The land of the duchy is today a part of Italy.

The county of Aosta was originally ruled by the bishops of Aosta in the 10th and early 11th centuries. Upon the death of Bishop Anselm in 1026, however, Conrad the Salic ensured that the secular powers of the important Alpine territory passed to the bishop's brother-in-law, his ally Humbert the White-handed, rather than remaining tied to the diocese, which fell to Anselm's unfriendly nephew Burchard. Humbert's son Odo then wed Adelaide, securing the March of Turin. The county was elevated to a duchy by Frederick Barbarossa.

Duke Emmanuel Philibert made French the official language of the duchy in 1561, but it retained its own traditional institutions as late as 1766. It received its first intendant in 1773. It had its own taxation system down to 7 October 1783, when it was brought under the cadaster. According to Jean-Baptiste de Tillier (died 1744):
The duchy of Aosta has always been a state, forming a single undivided body. The seventy-eight church-towers, or rather the cities, towns, parishes and separate communities which exist in the Valley, are members of this state.

See also
 Diocese of Aosta
 Aosta Valley

References

Sources
 .
 .
 
 .

History of Savoy
History of Aosta Valley